The 1917–18 Swiss International Ice Hockey Championship was the third edition of the international ice hockey championship in Switzerland. HC Bellerive Vevey won the championship by defeating HC Rosey Gstaad in the final.

Final 
HC Bellerive Vevey - HC Rosey Gstaad 2:1

External links 
Swiss Ice Hockey Federation – All-time results

International
Swiss International Ice Hockey Championship seasons